Capella Island is a 230-acre (0.93 km2) uninhabited island that is owned by the United States Virgin Islands.  It is located about 2 miles (4 km) south of the island of St. Thomas.  It is adjacent to Buck Island, home of Buck Island National Wildlife Refuge, about twice the size of Capella.  Together Capella, Buck, and associated islets are sometimes referred to as the Capella Islands.

References

Islands of the United States Virgin Islands
Uninhabited islands of the United States Virgin Islands
Landforms of Saint Thomas, U.S. Virgin Islands